The  is a DC electric multiple unit (EMU) train type operated by the private railway operator Keikyu in the Tokyo area of Japan since 1998. It replaced the earlier 2000 series on limited-stop  reserved seat services. A total of 10 8-car sets were built by Kawasaki Heavy Industries and Tokyu Car, and the first sets entered service on 28 March 1998.

Service
The 2100 series are mainly used on limited-stop on limited-stop  service on the Main Line and Kurihama Line. Some trains also inter-run with one stop on the Asakusa Line, stopping at Sengakuji Station only.

AC traction motor systems

The Keikyu 2100 series was Japan's first standard-gauge train to use Siemens-supplied GTO-VVVF propulsion system. Subsequently, similar propulsion was also installed on 56 cars of the N1000 series. The uniqueness of the propulsion system made its way into various music and popular culture, such as Super Bell"Z. Due to the unavailability of substitute parts for the train's GTO-VVVF propulsion system, the propulsion system on the trains was replaced with a new inverter, which does not have a solfège scale.

By March 2015, all of the original Siemens-supplied GTO-VVVF traction systems used on the 2100 series were replaced with new IGBT-VVVF traction systems manufactured by Toyo Denki. By July 2021, all Siemens-supplied GTO-VVVF traction systems in Japan were phased out.

Formation
, ten eight-car sets are in operation, formed as follows, with four motored (M) cars and four trailer (T) cars, and car 1 at the Misakiguchi end.

The two "Tp" cars are each fitted with two single-arm pantographs.

Interior
Passenger accommodation consists of transverse seating arranged 2+2 abreast, with seat backs that can be flipped over to face the direction of travel. The windows on the 2100 series are double-glazed, with curtains.

Refurbishment
Set 2101 was the first 2100 series set to undergo refurbishment, in 2013. Modifications include replacing the passenger windows at the ends of each car with opening windows, replacing the curtains on these windows with roller blinds, replacing the original fluorescent tube lighting with LED lighting, installation of door chimes as well as a single LCD passenger information screen above the doors.

Livery variations
Trainset 2157 carried a "Keikyu Blue Sky Train" livery from 11 June 2005  From then, set 2133 inherited the "Keikyu Blue Sky Train" livery. From 21 February 2016, set 2133 operated in a modified version of its blue livery, adapted to resemble the livery of Taiwan Railways Administration trains, to mark the first anniversary of the signing of a friendship agreement between Keikyu and Taiwan Railways Administration.

Keikyu teamed up with Sega to decorate a special limited edition "Sonic the Hedgehog/Puyo Puyo" train which ran on the Keikyu Airport Line from 14 November 2016 to 17 December 2016 to celebrate the 25th anniversary for both games. The train was part of the Keikyu 2100 series' "Keikyu Blue Sky Train" livery and featured images of Sonic, Tails, Knuckles, Amy, Shadow, Silver, Eggman and Carbuncle as well as a collection of the game’s expressive stacking blobs. In addition, signs at the Airport Line’s Otorii Station, the closest stop to the site of Sega’s original office prior to 2018, were featuring special images honoring the games.

References

External links

 Keikyu 2100 series official information 

Electric multiple units of Japan
2100 series
Train-related introductions in 1998
Kawasaki multiple units
1500 V DC multiple units of Japan
Tokyu Car multiple units